The 1993 Australian Drivers' Championship was a motor racing competition open to drivers of racing cars complying with CAMS Formula Brabham regulations. The championship winner was awarded the 1993 CAMS Gold Star.

Calendar
The title was contested over a six-round series:	
 Round 1, Symmons Plains, Tasmania, 14 March 1993	
 Round 2, Symmons Plains, Tasmania, 14 March 1993	
 Round 3, Lakeside, Queensland, 18 April 1993	
 Round 4, Lakeside, Queensland, 18 April 1993	
 Round 5, Eastern Creek, New South Wales, 6 June 1993	
 Round 6, Eastern Creek, New South Wales, 6 June 1993	
Championship points were awarded to the first ten finishers in each round on a 20–15–12–10–8–6–4–3–2–1 basis. All six performances were included when calculating a driver's final points total.

Results

References

 
 
 
 
 CAMS Manual of Motor Sport, 1993
 Official Programme, Mallala, 4 July 1993

Australian Drivers' Championship
Drivers' Championship
Formula Holden